The Antelope Hills are a low mountain range in the Transverse Ranges, in western Kern County, California. In 1910 Arnold and Johnson from the United States Geological Survey proposed the name "Antelope Hills" for "the group of low hills [that] are a range for the few wild antelope left in this region."

References 

Mountain ranges of Kern County, California
Geography of the San Joaquin Valley
Transverse Ranges
Hills of California
Mountain ranges of Southern California